Pink Freud is a Polish jazz band set up in Gdańsk in 1998 led by Wojtek Mazolewski.

Current members 

  – bass guitar, double bass, loop sampler
 Karol Gola – saxophone
 Adam Milwiw-Baron – trumpet, trombone
 Rafał Klimczuk – drums

Discography 
Studio albums

Live albums

Awards

References

External links 

 Pink Freud on Facebook

Musical groups established in 1998
Polish jazz ensembles